Tseng Shu-o (born 6 September 1984) is a Taiwanese footballer who plays as a midfielder for Spanish Primera Nacional club CF Joventut Almassora. She has represented Chinese Taipei since 2002, and she received the Most Valuable Player award in the AFC U-19 Women's Championship in 2002.

Unlike most female players in the country that give themselves to teaching or other careers after graduating from college, Tseng kept seeking opportunities to play abroad. In March 2009, she passed the test provided by Fukuoka J. Anclas, a club in the Japanese L. League Division 2. However, because the Fukuoka club does not pay wages to players, she gave it up due to lacking stable financial assistance for living in Japan. In September, she joined Canberra United FC of Australian W-League with Chinese Taipei teammate Lin Chiung-ying.

Tseng made her debut for Canberra United in 2009 W-League season's first-round game against Sydney FC on October 11, 2009. However, she could not help the team and Canberra lost 1–2. On October 17, she scored her first goal in the 3rd-round game in which Canberra had a 2–2 draw with Perth Glory. On October 24, 2009, she scored twice, in a 2–0 victory for Canberra United over Melbourne Victory. The second goal was particularly sublime, as she weaved through defenders and rounded the goalkeeper to score.
On September 20, 2012, she signed with AS Saint Étienne.

Tseng has also made an impression for Canberra United, with her striking purple-coloured hair.

Early life
Tseng Shu-o' was born in Taoyuan, Kaohsiung County – now part of Kaohsiung City. She is a Taiwanese aborigine who belongs to the Bunun tribe.

International goals
Scores and results list Chinese Taipei's goal tally first.

References

External links

 Tseng Shu-o profile at FIFA.com
 Tseng Shu-o introduction 

1984 births
Living people
Canberra United FC players
A-League Women players
Expatriate women's soccer players in Australia
Footballers from Kaohsiung
Bunun people
Taiwanese women's footballers
Vancouver Whitecaps FC (women) players
USL W-League (1995–2015) players
Expatriate women's footballers in Austria
SV Neulengbach (women) players
AS Saint-Étienne (women) players
ASPTT Albi players
Expatriate women's footballers in France
Taiwanese expatriate footballers
Taiwanese expatriate sportspeople in France
Footballers at the 2006 Asian Games
ŽFK Spartak Subotica players
ŽNK Split players
Expatriate women's footballers in Serbia
Women's association football midfielders
Asian Games competitors for Chinese Taipei
ÖFB-Frauenliga players
Croatian Women's First Football League players
Taiwanese expatriates in Spain
Expatriate women's footballers in Spain
Chinese Taipei women's international footballers